Sir James O'Grady,  (6 May 1866 – 10 December 1934) was a trade unionist and Labour Party politician in the United Kingdom. He was the first colonial governor appointed by the Labour Party from within its own ranks.

Early life
O'Grady was born in Bristol to Irish parents. His father was a labourer, and after leaving school at ten, O'Grady did various lowly jobs, before training as a cabinet-maker, and became active in the Amalgamated Union of Cabinetmakers.

Political career

A member of the Independent Labour Party and supported by the Labour Representation Committee, he was elected at the 1906 general election as Member of Parliament (MP) for Leeds East. He had benefited from the Gladstone–MacDonald pact negotiated between Herbert Gladstone and Ramsay MacDonald, and faced only a Unionist opponent, whom he defeated by a wide margin.

O'Grady was re-elected at the elections in January 1910 and December 1910 elections, and when the Leeds East constituency was abolished for the 1918 general election, he was returned unopposed for the new Leeds South East constituency. He held that seat until he stepped down from Parliament at the 1924 general election.

In the House of Commons, he spoke frequently, particularly on foreign affairs, and was noted as a strong supporter of the First World War, speaking at recruitment rallies. He was also Labour's only Roman Catholic MP.

Through his role in the Amalgamated Union of Cabinet Makers, he had been President of the Trades Union Congress in 1898, and he continued his union activities whilst an MP. After a variety of posts in unions related to the furniture trades, he became general secretary of the National Federation of General Workers in 1918.

Governorships

In 1924, Ramsay MacDonald's First Labour Government offered O'Grady the post of British Ambassador to the Soviet Union, and he accepted. He was a logical choice because he had successfully negotiated an exchange of prisoners in 1919 and had been involved in international trade union-led efforts to relieve the Russian famine in 1921, but O'Grady did not in the end get the job, because the government postponed exchanging ambassadors.

Instead O'Grady became Governor of Tasmania from 1924 to 1930. The first Labour politician to be appointed as a colonial governor by a Labour government. His appointment was resisted by the Australian Labor Party, which wanted the job to go to an Australian.

O'Grady was knighted as a Knight Commander of the Order of St Michael and St George and moved to Tasmania, taking office on 23 December. His governorship was marked by conflicts with the Legislative Council (which urged to do more to promote economic development), and his governor's reports were outspoken, but he appears to have parted on good terms.

O'Grady's next appointment was in 1931, as Governor of the Falkland Islands, but he retired in 1934 due to ill-health. He died later that year, aged 68.

Notes

References
 
 Australian Dictionary of Biography online: O'Grady, Sir James (1866–1934)
 Dictionary of National Biography: James O'Grady

External links
Picture of O'Grady at the State Library of Victoria
 

1866 births
1934 deaths
Trade unionists from Bristol
General secretaries of British trade unions
Presidents of the General Federation of Trade Unions (UK)
Labour Party (UK) MPs for English constituencies
British people of Irish descent
UK MPs 1906–1910
UK MPs 1910
UK MPs 1910–1918
UK MPs 1918–1922
UK MPs 1922–1923
UK MPs 1923–1924
Governors of Tasmania
Governors of the Falkland Islands
Knights Commander of the Order of St Michael and St George
British Roman Catholics
Presidents of the Trades Union Congress
British cabinetmakers
Politicians from Bristol